Sharon is a town in Woodward County, Oklahoma, United States. The population was 135 at the 2010 census.

Geography
Sharon is located at  (36.276429, -99.338533).

Demographics

As of the census of 2000, there were 122 people, 45 households, and 32 families residing in the town. There were 52 housing units at an average density of 431.9 per square mile (167.3/km2). The racial makeup of the town was 94.26% White, 4.10% Native American, and 1.64% from two or more races.

There were 45 households, out of which 33.3% had children under the age of 18 living with them, 66.7% were married couples living together, and 26.7% were non-families. 24.4% of all households were made up of individuals, and 13.3% had someone living alone who was 65 years of age or older. The average household size was 2.71 and the average family size was 3.18.

In the town, the population was spread out, with 31.1% under the age of 18, 2.5% from 18 to 24, 28.7% from 25 to 44, 15.6% from 45 to 64, and 22.1% who were 65 years of age or older. The median age was 36 years. For every 100 females, there were 82.1 males. For every 100 females age 18 and over, there were 100.0 males.

The median income for a household in the town was $45,000, and the median income for a family was $46,667. Males had a median income of $24,688 versus $28,333 for females. The per capita income for the town was $12,444. There were 10.0% of families and 18.4% of the population living below the poverty line, including 35.4% of under eighteens and none of those over 64.

References

External links
  Kahoe, Richard D. and Walter E. Adams. "Sharon," Encyclopedia of Oklahoma History and Culture

Towns in Woodward County, Oklahoma
Towns in Oklahoma